Vevay is a town located in Jefferson Township and the county seat of Switzerland County, Indiana, United States, along the Ohio River. The population was 1,683 at the 2010 census.

History
The first settlers who arrived in 1802 were Swiss immigrants intending on cultivating grapes and producing wine. It was named after the Swiss town of Vevey. The town was platted in 1813. When Switzerland County was formed in 1814, Vevay was made the county seat.

The Vevay post office has been in operation since 1816. The community was incorporated as a town in 1836. Vevay collected a reputation of being home to the first commercial winery in the United States; However, the first certified commercial winery was established in Nicholasville, Kentucky in 1799 by Swiss immigrant John Dufour. The Edward and George Cary Eggleston House, Old Hoosier Theatre, Benjamin Schenck Mansion, and Switzerland County Courthouse are listed on the National Register of Historic Places.

Geography
Vevay is located at  (38.745837, -85.071044), along the Ohio River and Indiana State Road 56/156.

Climate
The climate in this area is characterized by hot, humid summers and generally mild to cool winters.  According to the Köppen Climate Classification system, Vevay has a humid subtropical climate, abbreviated "Cfa" on climate maps.

Demographics

2010 census
As of the census of 2010, there were 1,683 people, 725 households, and 393 families living in the town. The racial makeup of the town was 97.1% White, 0.5% African American, 0.5% Asian, 0.7% from other races, and 1.2% from two or more races. Hispanic or Latino of any race were 1.1% of the population.

There were 725 households, of which 27.6% had children under the age of 18 living with them, 36.3% were married couples living together, 14.2% had a female householder with no husband present, 3.7% had a male householder with no wife present, and 45.8% were non-families. 39.9% of all households were made up of individuals, and 15.3% had someone living alone who was 65 years of age or older. The average household size was 2.18 and the average family size was 2.89.

The median age in the town was 40.8 years. 20.3% of residents were under the age of 18; 9.2% were between the ages of 18 and 24; 25.7% were from 25 to 44; 27.2% were from 45 to 64; and 17.6% were 65 years of age or older. The gender makeup of the town was 48.8% male and 51.2% female.

2000 census
As of the census of 2000, there were 1735 people, 719 households, and 437 families living in the town. The racial makeup of the town was 98.67% White, 0.23% African American, 0.17% Native American, 0.12% Asian, 0.69% from other races, and 0.12% from two or more races. Hispanic or Latino of any race were 1.44% of the population.

There were 719 households, out of which 29.3% had children under the age of 18 living with them, 40.2% were married couples living together, 16.6% had a female householder with no husband present, and 39.1% were non-families. 33.8% of all households were made up of individuals, and 15.9% had someone living alone who was 65 years of age or older. The average household size was 2.29 and the average family size was 2.92.

In the town, the population was spread out, with 24.4% under the age of 18, 9.1% from 18 to 24, 25.2% from 25 to 44, 22.0% from 45 to 64, and 19.2% who were 65 years of age or older. The median age was 38 years. For every 100 females, there were 82.6 males. For every 100 females age 18 and over, there were 77.2 males.

The median income for a household in the town was $27,448, and the median income for a family was $32,857. Males had a median income of $28,068 versus $20,167 for females. The per capita income for the town was $15,477. About 11.4% of families and 15.1% of the population were below the poverty line, including 15.2% of those under age 18 and 11.8% of those age 65 or over.

Education

Elementary schools
 Jeff-Craig Elementary School

Middle schools
 Switzerland Middle School

High schools
Switzerland County Senior High School

Others
The town has a lending library, the Switzerland County Public Library.

Arts and culture

The Swiss Wine Festival
Vevay holds an annual celebration called the Swiss Wine Festival.  It is usually held on the last weekend in August, as well as the preceding Thursday and Friday.  The festival has many fun activities such as ferry rides on the Ohio River, amusement rides, pageants, car shows, musical performances, cheerleading competitions, the famed grape stomps, and both Beer and Wine Gardens. Many people also set up booths for shopping. On Saturday night, most gather on the docks and close to the river to watch a fireworks show. People from all over the Indiana/Kentucky/Ohio tristate come to enjoy the festive celebration. This festival was first celebrated in the 1970s  and soon became the most adored tradition of the locals.

Origin
Since 1797, approximately every 22 years, la Fête des Vignerons (The Winegrowers' Festival) is celebrated in the Swiss city of Vevey.

Points of interest
"Life on the Ohio" River History Museum reflects Vevay's and Switzerland County's heritage on the Ohio River. Open year-round (excluding major holidays) Sunday - Saturday from 10 - 5.
Switzerland County Historical Museum is located in an old Presbyterian church, built in 1860. Open year-round (excluding major holidays) Saturday - Sunday from 10 - 5.
The first Switzerland County Courthouse was built in 1822 and is listed on the National Register of Historic Places. It was replaced by the one that stands today in 1865, built by contractor John Haley.
The Benjamin Franklin Schenck Mansion is a 35-room mansion, built in 1874 by Benjamin Franklin Schenck
The U.P. Schenck House was built in 1846 for Ulysses P. Schenck, a Swiss riverboat captain who owned a fleet of flat bottom river boats.
The Armstrong Tavern is a two-story log house built in 1816 by Thomas Armstrong.
The Hoosier Theatre was built in 1837 and is listed on the National Register of Historic Places.

Notable people
 Lydia Moss Bradley, philanthropist and founder of Bradley University
 Ebenezer Dumont, Civil War general and U.S. Congressman
 Julia Louisa Dumont (1794-1857), educator and writer
 Edward Eggleston, Methodist minister and author
 George Cary Eggleston, author, editor, Civil War Historian, and brother to  Edward Eggleston.
 Bertha Fry, supercentenarian, born in Vevay in 1893, died in 2007 at age 113 years, 11 months, 13 days (third oldest living person at the time of death)
 Ken Maynard, actor and stuntman
 Kermit Maynard, actor and stuntman, played for Indiana University Football 1920s, Ken Maynard's younger brother.
 Will Henry Stevens, artist
 E. S. L. Thompson (1848-1944), writer 
 Kat Von D, tattoo artist

In popular culture
The 1975 TV Movie A Girl Named Sooner was set in and filmed in and around Vevay in the summer of 1974.

See also

 List of cities and towns along the Ohio River
 Vevey (Switzerland) 
 The Winegrowers' Festival in Vevey

References

External links
 Town website

Towns in Switzerland County, Indiana
Towns in Indiana
County seats in Indiana
Populated places established in 1802
Indiana populated places on the Ohio River
1802 establishments in Indiana Territory